Xingye may refer to:

Xingye County, in Guangxi, China
Xingye Copper, copper producer in China